The K6 microprocessor was launched by AMD in 1997. The main advantage of this particular microprocessor is that it was designed to fit into existing desktop designs for Pentium-branded CPUs. It was marketed as a product that could perform as well as its Intel Pentium II equivalent but at a significantly lower price. The K6 had a considerable impact on the PC market and presented Intel with serious competition.

Background

The AMD K6 is a superscalar P5 Pentium-class microprocessor, manufactured by AMD, which superseded the K5.

The AMD K6 is based on the Nx686 microprocessor that NexGen was designing when it was acquired by AMD. Despite the name implying a design evolving from the K5, it is in fact a totally different design that was created by the NexGen team, including chief processor architect Greg Favor, and adapted after the AMD purchase. The K6 processor included a feedback dynamic instruction reordering mechanism, MMX instructions, and a floating-point unit (FPU). It was also made pin-compatible with Intel's Pentium, enabling it to be used in the widely available "Socket 7"-based motherboards. Like the AMD K5, Nx586, and Nx686 before it, the K6 translated x86 instructions on the fly into dynamic buffered sequences of micro-operations. A later variation of the K6 CPU, K6-2, added floating-point-based SIMD instructions, called 3DNow!. 

The K6 was originally launched in April 1997, running at speeds of 166 and 200 MHz. It was followed by a 233 MHz version later in 1997. Initially, the AMD K6 processors used a Pentium II-based performance rating (PR2) to designate their speed. The PR2 rating was dropped because the rated frequency of the processor was the same as the real frequency. The release of the 266 MHz version of this chip was not until the second quarter of 1998, when AMD was able to move to the 0.25-micrometre manufacturing process. The lower voltage and higher multiplier of the K6-266 meant that it was not fully compatible with some Socket 7 motherboards, similar to the later K6-2 processors. The final iteration of the K6 design was released in May 1998, running at 300 MHz.

Features

Models

K6 (Model 6)
8.8 million transistors in 350 nm
L1-Cache: 32 + 32 KB (data + instructions)
MMX
Socket 7
Front side bus: 66 MHz
First release: April 2, 1997
VCore: 2.9 V (166/200) 3.2/3.3 V (233)
Clockrate: 166, 200, 233 MHz

K6 "Little Foot" (Model 7)
CPUID: family 5, model 7, stepping 0
8.8 million transistors in 250 nm
L1-Cache: 32 + 32 KB (data + instructions)
MMX
Socket 7
Front side bus: 66 MHz
First release: January 6, 1998
VCore: 2.2 V
Clockrate: 200, 233, 266, 300 MHz

References

Further reading
 Gwennap, Linley (31 March 1997). "K6 Is World's Fastest x86 Chip". Microprocessor Report.
 Slater, Michael (28 October 1998). "K6 to Boost AMD's Position in 1997". Microprocessor Report.

External links

 
 AMD K6, first of an impressive dynasty
 Technical overview of the AMD-K6 series
 technical dissection of the 6th generation x86 CPUs

Computer-related introductions in 1997
K06
AMD microarchitectures
Superscalar microprocessors
X86 microarchitectures